is a subway station on the Toei Mita Line in Bunkyo, Tokyo, Japan, operated by Toei Subway.

Lines
Hakusan Station is served by the Toei Mita Line, and is numbered I-13.

Station layout
The station has two opposite side platforms serving two tracks.

Platforms

S__66084873.jpg

History
Hakusan Station opened on 30 June 1972.Recently, many restaurants have gone bankrupt and collapsed due to the town's rapidly ageing population.

See also
 List of railway stations in Japan

References

External links
 Toei station information 

Railway stations in Japan opened in 1972
Railway stations in Tokyo
Toei Mita Line